Mehdi Mousavi, also Mehdi Moosavi, also Seyed Mahdi Mousavi (Persian: سید مهدی موسوی)(born 1976) is an Iranian poet. He is known for poems on social issues. Mousavi was arrested in 2013, along with poet Fateme Ekhtesari.  Mousavi was sentenced to nine years in prison plus 99 lashes. A group of poets signed a petition asking for his release.  Mousavi escaped from Iran in January 2016. Mousavi is a poet, editor, cultural activist and pharmacist from Iran. He came to Lillehammer as part of the Cities of Refuge Network in 2017.

Career 
Two collections of poems entitled Suddenly and Beeping for the Sheep were denied permission for publication by the authorities. Many more of his poems denied publication were published online.

Most of the works by this movement has faced severe censorship by the Iranian officials, and almost all of these works were banned in Iran, and have therefore been distributed underground. 

Mousavi has run creative writing workshops where he has been teaching writing of poetry, short-stories and novels. Banned from meeting in public, they would often meet in people’s homes. The workshops were regularly shut down by the Iranian authorities, who placed Mousavi and several of his peers under surveillance.

Mehdi Mousavi also holds a PhD in Pharmacy, and owned and ran his own pharmacy in Ilam, Iran, from 2012-2015.

Arrest 
On December 6, 2013, Fatemeh Ekhtesari and Mehdi Moosavi had planned to travel to Turkey for a literary workshop, but they were stopped at the airport.  They were told they were under a travel ban, and their passports were confiscated.  A few hours later they disappeared and did not appear again until December 24, 2014, when it was known they were in Section 2A of Evin Prison.  Torture and other abuse of prisoners is common in the prison, which is controlled by the Intelligence Division of the Islamic Revolution Guards Corps.  On January 14, 2014, Ekhtesari and Mousavi were released on bail. Their lawyer said Moosavi was sentenced to six years in prison for "insulting the holy sanctities", three years for "storing tear gas", and 99 lashes for "illicit relations". The amount of the bail was 200 million tomans, or about 60,000 USD.

Work 
Many of his works were banned in Iran and distributed underground. The authorities refused publication of two of his collections, "Suddenly" and "Beeping for the Sheep". Some of Mousavi's lyrics have been performed by Shahin Najafi, an Iranian singer in exile.

Published works include:

 The Angels Have Committed Suicide (2002) (needs references)
 I Only Publish These for You (2005) (needs references)
 The Little Bird Was Neither a Bird nor Little (2010) (needs references since the books and his position as a literary movement has been mentioned in a letter based on the information provided to PEN and still no sign of any book even a PDF file on the net)

References

External links 
 Four Poems by Mehdi Mousavi

1976 births
Living people
Iranian emigrants to Norway
Poets from Tehran